The 36th Infantry Regiment is a United States Army infantry regiment.

History

The 36th Infantry was formed on 1 July 1916 at Brownsville, Texas from elements of the 4th Infantry, 26th Infantry and 28th Infantry. It was assigned to the 12th Division on 5 July 1918, relieved from the 12th Division 31 January 1919, and inactivated at Fort Jay New York on 13 October 1921.

The 36th was reassigned to the Ninth Infantry Division on 24 March 1923 and relieved from the Ninth Infantry Division on 1 August 1940. It was redesignated the 36th Infantry (Armored) on 15 April 1941 and reassigned to the Third Armored Division. On 1 July 1942 it was redesignated the 36th Armored Infantry Regiment. The regiment's first commander was Walton Walker.

The 1st Battalion, 36th Infantry Regiment (Spartans), was reactivated at Ray Barracks, Germany, in 1996, having been reflagged from 3-5 CAV, which was stationed at nearby Kirchgöns. The battalion was assigned to the 1st Brigade, 1st Armored Division (Ready First Combat Team). The battalion participated in an 11 month rotation in Bosnia Implementation Force (IFOR), followed by a sixth month Stabilisation Force (SFOR) rotation ending in another six month rotation as part of the Kosovo Force (KFOR) in 2000.  The battalion was stationed at Camp Monteith. In May 2003, the Spartans deployed to central Baghdad, Iraq, for a fifteen-month mission in support of the Iraq War's Operation Iraqi Freedom. The battalion deployed to Iraq for a second time in 2006, where it provided security and stability to the city of Hit. The unit redeployed to Germany in February 2007.

The 1st Battalion of the 36th Infantry Regiment was reactivated on 16 September 2008 and assigned to the 1st Brigade Combat Team (currently 1st Armored Brigade Combat Team), 1st Armored Division. The motto is "Deeds Not Words!"

Campaign participation credit
World War II
 Normandy
 Northern France
 Rhineland
 Ardennes-Alsace
 Central Europe

Iraq War
 Operation Iraqi Freedom

Global War on Terrorism
 Operartion Enduring Freedom
 Operation Freedom Sentinel

Decorations
 Presidential Unit Citation for the Roer River Salient; Companies "A" and "C" of the First Battalion
 Presidential Unit Citation; First Battalion assault on the Siegfried Line
 Presidential Unit Citation; Medical Section 2nd Battalion Fromental France
 Presidential Unit Citation; Medical Section 3rd Battalion Stolberg, Germany
 Presidential Unit Citation, Siegfried Line; First Battalion
 Presidential Unit Citation, Echtz-Hoben; First Battalion
 Belgian Fourragère
 Presidential Unit Citation, Iraq; First Battalion (2004)
 Joint Meritorious Unit Award, Iraq; First Battalion (2004)
 Navy Unit Commendation, Al Anbar, Iraq; First Battalion (2007)
 Joint Meritorious Unit Award, Al Anbar, Iraq; First Battalion (2007)
 Meritorious Unit Commendation, Iraq; First Battalion (2010)

References and notes

External links

 36th Infantry Lineage and Honors at the United States Army Center of Military History
 36th Armored Infantry Regiment during WWII

0036